Bagh-e Sorkh (also Romanized as Bāgh-e Sorkh and Bāghsorkh; also known as Bāgh-i-Surkh) is a village in Manzariyeh Rural District, in the Central District of Shahreza County, Isfahan Province, Iran. At the 2006 census, its population was 265, in 43 families.

References 

Populated places in Shahreza County